Holy Ghost Seminary was a Roman Catholic Christian seminary in Ypsilanti, Michigan run by the Congregation of the Holy Spirit. The seminary was opened because the closest Holy Ghost location, in Philadelphia, had a waiting list of potential students. Since Detroit had a large Catholic population, the holy order chose Ypsilanti as the site for their new seminary: "Rather than send students to Philadelphia, we decided to build a school in Michigan," recalls Father Egbert Figaro, former assistant principal of the Holy Ghost seminary. John Sisterman was a graduate of the seminary.

References

Catholic seminaries in the United States
Ypsilanti, Michigan